Ghoul is an American thrash metal band from Oakland, California. Though the members' actual identities are meant to be concealed, it is known that some members or past members of Ghoul also play or have played in other bands such as Impaled, Dystopia, Wolves in the Throne Room, Exhumed, Phobia, Morbid Angel, Asunder and Morbosidad. Ghoul released their debut album in 2002 and have released five studio albums.

History 
The masked members go by the stage names Cremator, Fermentor, Digestor, and Dissector. The band's lyrics describe a large cast of characters, including themselves. Much of the known information concerning the band comes from the "Curio Shop Owner" one of the many characters mentioned in their songs. They claim to be mutants that come from Creepsylvania. Ghoul was signed after self-releasing a demo. Their musical style is best described as a blend of thrash and grindcore with death metal vocals and lyrics. In 2008, Ghoul released a split 7-inch with Brody's Militia. In November 2011, the band released their fourth album, Transmission Zero, and embarked on a North American tour opening for shock rockers Gwar. In early 2012, Ghoul once again toured the United States, opening for Gwar. In mid-2012, the band toured the U.S. on a headlining run, playing festivals such as Maryland Deathfest, Chaos in Tejas, and the third annual GWAR B-Q. The band teamed up with Cannabis Corpse for a brief tour of Europe in January/February 2013.

Members 

Cremator (Ross Sewage) – vocals, bass (2003–present)
Digestor (Sean McGrath) – vocals, guitar (2001–present)
Dissector (Peter Svoboda) – vocals, guitar (2014–present)
Fermentor (Justin Ennis) – vocals, drums (2017–present)

Former members 
Dr. X (Justin Green) – drums (2001)
Fermentor (Raul Varela) – drums (2001–2004)
Cremator (Andrew LaBarre) – guitars, bass, vocals (2001–2003)
Fermentor (Dino Sommese) – drums and vocals (2004–2013)
Dissector (Dan Randall) vocals, guitars (2004–2014)
Fermentor (Peژ Mon) drums (2013–2017)

Live crew/character performers 
Scott Bryan
Peter "Pove" Povey
Scotty Heath
Tennessee Dave
Peter "Hmong the Living" Vang

Characters 
Mr. Fang – The Curio Shoppe owner
The Swamp Hag – witch
The Mutant Mutilator – aka The Gore Boar
Killbot – Mark I and Mark II (with Walt Disney's brain)
The Ghoul Hunter
Kogar the Destructor
Baron Samedi
Constance Spoogeous – Death Humper – Holocaust survivor – Child Predator – Salvation Army Bell Ringer
The Grand Basilisk – The Cult Leader
Skuz – Crusty punk and owner of the dog Armpit
Kreeg – Motorcycle and surfing enthusiast, monster
Commandant Yanish Dobrunkum – Ruler of Creepsylvania
Bernard Fussbottom – Tech entrepreneur and inventor of the I-Eye Mark I

Timeline

Discography

Studio albums 
We Came for the Dead!!! (2002, Razorback Records)
Maniaxe (2003, Razorback Records)
Splatterthrash (2006, Razorback Records) (reissue 2011, Tankcrimes)
Transmission Zero (2011, Tankcrimes)
Hang Ten (EP) (2014, Tankcrimes)
Dungeon Bastards (2016, Tankcrimes)

Live albums 
Live In The Flesh (2021, Tankcrimes)

Compilation and split albums 
We Came for the Dead & Maniaxe (2008, Tankcrimes)
Ghoul / Brody's Militia (2008, Rescued from Life Records)
Splatterhash (split with Cannabis Corpse, 2013, Tankcrimes)
Ill Bill / Ghoul (2018, Tankcrimes)

Demo 
Ghoul's Night Out (2001, self-released demo)
"Graveyard Mosh"
"Ghoul"
"Rot Gut"
"Ghouls Night Out" (Misfits cover)

Single 
"Kids in America" (2012, Tankcrimes; Kim Wilde cover)
"Nazi Smasher" (2020, Tankcrimes)

References

External links 

Official website

Death metal musical groups from California
Thrash metal musical groups from California
Musical groups established in 2001
Musical quartets
Masked musicians
Bands with fictional stage personas